Alex Mitchell (16 May 1912 – 9 April 2001) was an Australian rules footballer who played for the South Melbourne Football Club in the Victorian Football League (VFL).

Notes

References

External links 
		

1912 births
2001 deaths
Australian rules footballers from Victoria (Australia)
Australian Rules footballers: place kick exponents
Sydney Swans players